Christina M. Hull (born 1970) is an American mycologist and Professor in the Department of Biomolecular Chemistry at the University of Wisconsin School of Medicine and Public Health.

Education and career
Christina Hull completed her B.S. degree from the University of Utah in 1992. She then went on to complete a Ph.D. with Alexander D. Johnson at the University of California, San Francisco in 2000. Her thesis was titled "Identification and characterization of a mating type-like locus in the "asexual" pathogenic yeast Candida albicans". She then went on to complete a postdoctoral fellowship with Joseph Heitman at Duke University from 2000 to 2003. She is now a professor at the Department of Biomolecular Chemistry at the University of Wisconsin School of Medicine and Public Health.

Research
Hull's research focuses on fungal development, with a particular focus on how fungi enter and leave the spore form. Her group primarily does this work using the pathogenic fungus Cryptococcus.

Notable publications

Giles SS, Dagenais TRT... Hull CM (2009). Elucidating the pathogenesis of spores from the human fungal pathogen Crytococcus neoformans. Infection and Immunity. 77(8): pgs. 3491-3500
Hull CM, Raisner RM, Johnson AD (2000). Evidence for mating of the 'asexual' yeast Candida albicans in a mammalian host. Science. 289(5477): pgs. 307-310
Hull CM, Johnson AD (1999). Identification of a mating type-like locus in the asexual pathogenic yeast Candida albicans. Science. 285(5431): pgs. 1271-1275

References

University of Utah alumni
University of California, San Francisco alumni
University of Wisconsin–Madison faculty
American mycologists
Living people
1970 births